Zlatko Bašić (born 22 September 1975) is a Croatian professional footballer coach and former player who played as a defender.

References

1975 births
Living people
Sportspeople from Slavonski Brod
Association football defenders
Croatian footballers
NK Marsonia players
Rot-Weiß Oberhausen players
FC St. Pauli players
NK Vinogradar players
2. Bundesliga players
Croatian expatriate footballers
Expatriate footballers in Germany
Croatian expatriate sportspeople in Germany
Croatian football managers
HNK Hajduk Split non-playing staff